Moreno Valley High School may refer to:

 Moreno Valley High School (California), Moreno Valley, California
 Moreno Valley High School (New Mexico), Angel Fire, New Mexico